Cave Springs is a city in Benton County, Arkansas. The population was 5,495 at the time of the 2020 census, up from 1,729 in 2010 census. It is part of the Northwest Arkansas metropolitan area. In June 2022, Cave Springs was named the 3rd highest average home values in the state of Arkansas.

Geography
Cave Springs is located in southern central Benton County at  (36.277729, -94.223226), in the valley of Osage Creek. Arkansas Highway 112 (Main Street) leads north  to Bentonville and south  to Fayetteville. Arkansas Highway 264 (East Lowell Avenue) leads east  to Lowell and west (as Healing Springs Road)  to Northwest Arkansas National Airport.

Lake Keith, a small water basin in the middle of Cave Springs, harbors the rare Ozark Cavefish (Amblyopsis rosae). In October 2013, Lake Keith was temporarily drained.

Water from Lake Keith feeds into the Osage Creek, a tributary of the Illinois River.

Demographics

2020 census

As of the 2020 United States census, there were 5,495 people, 1,421 households, and 1,255 families residing in the city. The population density was 250.9 people per square mile. In the city, 32.9% of persons were under the age of 18 and 8.6% were 65 years of age or older. For every 100 females, there were 105.8 males.

Cave Springs is the wealthiest city in Arkansas.
The median income for a household in the city is $114,286. The per capita income for the city is $140,703. Only about 2.6% of the population lies below the poverty line.

Education 
Public education for elementary and secondary students is provided by two school districts. Most of the community is within the Bentonville School District. For some residents, public education is zoned to the Rogers School District.

School zoning for the Bentonville schools section is as follows:
 Most is to Evening Star Elementary School while portions are to Central Park-Morning Star Elementary School.
 Bright Field Middle School
 The majority is zoned to Fulbright Junior High School, with some areas to the west within the boundary of Grimsley Junior High School.
 The majority is zoned to Bentonville High School, with some areas to the west within the boundary of Bentonville West High School.

Government and politics

Politics

The current mayor is Randall Noblett who was first elected in 2018 after defeating Mayor Travis Lee by a margin of 248 votes.

The current state representatives that serve districts containing portions of Cave Springs are Rep. Kendon Underwood, Rep. Jim Dotson, and Rep. Delia Haak. The current state senator that serves the district containing Cave Springs is Sen. Bart Hester, who is also a resident of the city.

Notable people
Hugh A. Dinsmore, congressman and diplomat
Bart Hester, member of the Arkansas Senate
Kendon Underwood, member of the Arkansas House of Representatives

References

Cities in Benton County, Arkansas
Cities in Arkansas
Northwest Arkansas